Forest Acres is a city in Richland County, South Carolina, United States. The population was 10,606 at the 2020 census. It is part of the Columbia, South Carolina, Metropolitan Statistical Area and is an enclave of the city of Columbia.

Geography
Forest Acres is located at  (34.038687, -80.967446).

Demographics

2020 census

As of the 2020 United States census, there were 10,617 people, 4,683 households, and 2,716 families residing in the city.

2000 census
As of the census of 2000, there were 10,558 people, 4,987 households, and 2,842 families residing in the city. The population density was 2,300.9 people per square mile (888.1/km2). There were 5,232 housing units at an average density of 1,140.2 per square mile (440.1/km2). The racial makeup of the city is 80.87% White, 15.52% African American, 0.19% Native American, 1.16% Asian, 0.01% Pacific Islander, 1.02% from other races, and 1.22% from two or more races.  2.54% of the population are Hispanic or Latino of any race.

There were 4,987 households, out of which 22.6% had children under the age of 18 living with them, 44.0% were married couples living together, 10.7% had a female householder with no husband present, and 43.0% were non-families. 37.3% of all households were made up of individuals, and 15.9% had someone living alone who was 65 years of age or older. The average household size was 2.09 and the average family size was 2.76.

In the city, the population was spread out, with 19.9% under the age of 18, 6.6% from 18 to 24, 27.6% from 25 to 44, 23.7% from 45 to 64, and 22.2% who were 65 years of age or older. The median age was 42 years. For every 100 females, there were 81.2 males. For every 100 females age 18 and over, there were 77.1 males.

The median income for a household in the city was $46,628, and the median income for a family was $62,026. Males had a median income of $38,277 versus $31,438 for females. The per capita income for the city was $29,907. About 5.2% of families and 7.4% of the population were below the poverty line, including 12.0% of those under age 18 and 3.9% of those age 65 or over.

Education
A.C. Flora High School serves portions of Forest Acres and is in Richland County School District One.  Richland Northeast High School serves the majority of the city and is in Richland School District Two.

Government

The City of Forest Acres is governed by a mayor and four councilmen elected to four-year terms.

Mayor: Frank J. Brunson- served on city council since July 1, 1995; term expires in 2023

Council members:

 Haskell Kibler - served on city council since July 1, 2021; term expires in 2025
 David Black.- served on city council since July 1, 2021; term expires in 2025
 Tom Andrews - served on city council since July 1, 2019; term expires 2023
 John Barnes - served on city council since July 1, 2019; term expires 2023

Notable people
 Jordan Anderson, NASCAR driver
 Edgar L. McGowan, Commissioner of the South Carolina Department of Labor (1971-1989)

References

External links
 

Cities in South Carolina
Cities in Richland County, South Carolina
Columbia metropolitan area (South Carolina)